Major General Bùi Đình Đạm (born c. 1926 – 30 May 2009) was a general of the Army of the Republic of Vietnam (ARVN).

Military education
 Officers School of Vietnam, Class 1 of Phan Bội Châu
 U.S. Army Command and General Staff College

Military service
As a Colonel Bui was a key figure at the Battle of Ap Bac. He held various position in the ARVN:

 Platoon Leader, Company Leader: Co.1, Bn 3 VN (North Vietnam) 
 Served in Military Equipment Bureau, 1st Military Region.
 Chief of Staff, Thu Duc Reserved Officers School 
 Head of General Staff Bureau, Military Collegẹ 
 Chief of Staff, 7th Infantry Division 
 Deputy Commander, 7th Infantry Division 
 Commander, 7th Infantry Division 
 Head of G4 (logistics), Joint General Staff 
 Head of General Administration, Joint General Staff 
 Director of Mobilization Bureau, Defense Ministry 
 Director General of Personnel Bureau, Defense Ministry

References

External links
Major General Bui Dinh Dam's military resume

1920s births
2009 deaths
Army of the Republic of Vietnam generals
Vietnamese exiles
Vietnamese people of the Vietnam War
South Vietnamese military personnel of the Vietnam War
Non-U.S. alumni of the Command and General Staff College
Recipients of the National Order of Vietnam
Recipients of the Gallantry Cross (Vietnam)
Foreign recipients of the Legion of Merit
Date of birth missing